Brian Riley is the name of:

Brian Riley (footballer) (1937–2017), English footballer for Bolton Wanderers
Brian Riley (ice hockey) (born 1959), American ice hockey player and coach
Brian Riley (politician), American politician in Missouri
Brian Riley (rugby league), New Zealand player

See also
Brian Reilly (1901-1991), Irish chess master